Malouetia is a genus of plants in the family Apocynaceae, first described as a genus in 1844. It is native to Africa, South America, Central America, and the West Indies.

Species

formerly included
 Malouetia asiatica Siebold & Zucc. = Trachelospermum asiaticum (Siebold & Zucc.) Nakai 
 Malouetia riparia (Kunth) A.DC. = Tabernaemontana grandiflora Jacq.
 Malouetia tetrastachya (Kunth) Miers = Tabernaemontana siphilitica (L.f.) Leeuwenb.

Uses
Malouetia tamaquarina is used as an additive to some versions of the hallucinogenic drink Ayahuasca.

References

 
Apocynaceae genera
Taxonomy articles created by Polbot